This is a list of all the records and statistics of rugby league side the Toronto Wolfpack. It concentrates on the records of the team and the performances of the players who have played for this team. The newly created Wolfpack played their first game against Siddal ARFLC in the 2017 Challenge Cup on 25 February 2017, Toronto won the match 14–6. As of 5 October 2019 the Wolfpack have played 88 games.

Team records

Matches played

Results summary 

Italics: Club folded

Top 10 Highest scores

Lowest scores

Biggest wins

Biggest losses

Individual records

Most matches as captain

Most career appearances

Most career points

Most career tries

Most career goals

Most career drop goals

Most points in a season

Most tries in a season

Most goals in a season

Most drop goals in a season

Most points in a match

Most tries in a match

Most goals in a match

Most drop goals in a match

Attendance records

Season average attendance

Highest match attendance

Coaching

References

Statistics
Rugby league records and statistics